Iris de Freitas Brazao (1896 – 1989) was the first female lawyer in the Caribbean.

Life
Brazao was born in British Guiana. Her father was M. G. de Freitas, a merchant. After a short period studying at Toronto University, she enrolled at Aberystwyth University giving her address as Demarara. She studied botany, Latin and modern languages, law and jurisprudence and took an active part in student life. She graduated with a BA in 1922, and received her LL.B in 1927.

In 1929 she was admitted to the bar as the first woman to practise law in the Caribbean. She was also the first female prosecutor of a murder trial there.

In 1937 she married Alfred Casimiro Brazeo who was a legal draughtsman and several years younger than her. They lived at Georgetown in British Guiana where she continued to work as a barrister.

Legacy
In 2016, staff at her alma mater came across a postcard that featured her. Investigations revealed that she was a graduate of Aberystwyth University. In 2016 on International Women's Day her university named a room in the University’s Hugh Owen Library in her honour.

In 2018, to celebrate Black History Month in the United Kingdom, she was included in a list of 100 "Brilliant, Black and Welsh" people.

See also 
 First women lawyers around the world

References 

1896 births
1989 deaths
Afro-Guyanese people
Alumni of Aberystwyth University
British Guiana people